Guodian may refer to:

Guodian Chu Slips: a collection of classical Chinese texts found in the Guodian tombs in Jingmen, Hubei
China Guodian Corporation: a state-owned power generation enterprise in China
GD Power Development Company: a subsidiary and listed company of China Guodian Corporation
Towns (郭店镇)
Guodian, Xinzheng, in Xinzheng City, Henan
Guodian, Fengxiang County, in Fengxiang County, Shaanxi
Guodian, Jinan, in Licheng District, Jinan, Shandong